Magda Piskorczyk   is a Polish singer and instrumentalist. She plays acoustic, electric and bass guitars, as well as percussion instruments. She mainly performs music rooted in African traditions. A composer and musical arranger, she was a guest singer at many international festivals, among others in Taiwan, Germany, Sweden, Norway, England, Hungary and France. She is a member of the ZPAV ZPAV Academy of Phonography. Magda Piskorczyk conducts music workshops according to her own copyright program, including the Blues on Bobr. The result of such workshops in Warsaw OKO was released in 2012 as a CD "Magda Piskorczyk Masterclass".

Magda Piskorczyk is the author of the Blues Traveling studio album recorded with Michał Urbaniak, the album "Magda Live" which is a recording of her concert from Radio Gdansk, the disc "Live at Satyr blues" recorded with Slidin 'Slim from Sweden, a double album "Afro Groove" commemorating a tour with Billy Gibson from Memphis and Gospel music study album "Mahalia". "Magda Live", "Afro Groove" and "Mahalia" were nominated for the Fryderyk Prize for the Album of the Year.

She has twice been a semi-finalist at the International Blues Challenge in Memphis, TN, in the USA. She has been selected seven times as Vocalist of the Year (2003, 2004, 2006, 2009, 2011, 2012 and 2013) by readers of the "Twój Blues" magazine. In May 2008 Magda Piskorczyk, as one of the first two performers, played at the Aleja Star of the Polish Blues in Slawa near Zielona Góra. Magda Piskorczyk has been referred to as the "black voice in a white costume" after such a review of a concert in France ("Brillante chanteuse la voix noire et au costume blanc").

Magda Piskorczyk cooperates, records or performs with other bands, including Blues Flowers, Engerling and Konoba. She has performed with many well-known musicians, including Wojciech Karolak, Leszek Winder, Jerzy Styczynski, Leszek Cichoński, Bob Margolyn, Billy Gibson, Seckou Keita, Rita Engedalen, Bob Brozman, Greg Szłapczyński and Slidin 'Slim.

Music 
Piskorczyk's music includes her own arrangements of standards from the soul, blues, funk, rock, jazz and gospel music idioms, as well as her own compositions inspired by these trends.

Jan Chojnacki stated that "her music is original but not surprising, true to roots, yet contemporary, very thrifty in form and full of emotion".

Gospel music is one of Magda's greatest musical loves. Among the performers of this genre, Magda most appreciates the work of Mahalia Jackson. She was amongst various artists performing gospel standards in Poland, Germany, Hungary, England (at the City Sings Gospel in Liverpool) and France (at the Blues Sur Seine).

Piskorczyk is very interested in ethnic music from various parts of the world, which is also increasingly included in her repertoire. She sings mainly in English, sometimes in Polish, but also in other languages, such as Spanish, Creole or African languages such as Bambara and Tamaszek.

Biography 
Piskorczyk sang regularly in her early childhood. In a musical search, she found herself briefly in a rock repertoire to conclude that she was best at blues, gospel, jazz and related genres in the near acoustic roots.

In 2001 she made her debut at the Autumn Blues Festival in Bialystok, where her song "Sexy Mama won" the First Prize. A year later, also in Bialystok, she began her solo career. She co-created the Terraplane trio, and performed in duos with Michał Kielak (harmonica), Arkadiusz Osenkowski (sax), Marek Kapłon (guitar), Ola Siemieniuk (guitar) and Karolina Koriat (vocals). In 2003 on the album Blues Leader of the group Blues Flowers appeared a song I will not be a good girl, popularly known as the Outlander, written by Jaromie. In 2003 and 2005 she performed at the Big Stage of the Rawa Blues Festival.

Magda Piskorczyk was selected as the Vocalist of the Year 2003, and then also in 2004, 2006, 2009, 2011, 2012 and 2013 in the poll of the readers of your Blues quarterly.

In 2004, Piskorczyk was accepted to participate in the biggest international blues competition of the International Blues Challenge 2005 in Memphis. Rev. Rabia from Berkeley, an American blues singer, wrote about the artist on her website: The biggest discovery in active and exciting Polish blues. This girl must really love the blues. So young and from Eastern Europe! Excellent! She is better than many American blues singers !.

In 2005, an album titled Blues Traveling was released under the auspices of jazz composer Michael Urbaniak (who accepted the invitation, being impressed, as he himself stated, of her raw musical power) and friends. Since 2005 she regularly performs with her own band.

In 2005 Magda Piskorczyk re-qualified for the IBC competition, where she again reached the semi-finals. Vicky and Joe Price (Finalists) on the website said: We saw a lot of fantastic performers, but our favorite is Magda Piskorczyk from Poland. Magda has a "blue fire" in her soul and was able to share that fire with the listeners. Judges' opinions:

* Good energy Joy. Good vocals. Great ability to engage the public - Bonnie Tallmaw
 Very addictive performance. I like the way you engage the audience in your performance. Great sound - bold, courageous, energetic and character - this is it! That's what I think blues should be! Good selection of repertoire in your set! Very good! Fast, slow, cheerful, sad. This makes your show a great show! - Mark Loft
 Your Muddy Water Blues was excellent! I will remember him for a long time! Excellently! - John Pfeiffer.

In 2007 Magda Piskorczyk began work on a special program titled In the Tribute to Mahalia Jackson, which contains interpretations of works known from the records of the Queen of Gospel Music.

In March 2008, the first live album of Piskorczyk entitled Magda Live with the recording of an acoustic concert by RGstudia Radio Gdansk appeared on the publisher Artgraff. The band was composed by: Aleksandra Siemieniuk, Arkadiusz Osenkowski, Roman Ziobro, Maksymilian Ziobro. The album contains 13 songs and multimedia, among others. 15 minute video of the recorded concert. A year later the album was nominated for a Fryderyk Award in the Album of the Year - Blues category.

In May 2008, the first Blues Star Avenue in Poland was celebrated at the Las, Woda & Blues festival in Sława near Zielona Góra. Magda Piskorczyk, Tadeusz Nalepa and Sławek Wierzcholski were unveiled. During the ceremony Piskorczyk and Wierzchowski clapped their hands.

In 2009, the artist was invited to the international Konoba band, performing traditional West African music. In this group she sang, played bass and acoustic guitar and percussion instruments. The cooperation lasted until 2012.

In the spring of 2010, Piskorczyk made his first tour of Scandinavia. In mid 2010 a record was released a year earlier in Tarnobrzeg with Swedish vocalist, guitarist and composer Slidin 'Slim, titled Live at Satyrblues. On this album you can hear Aleksandra Siemieniuk (guitars) and Grzegorz Zawiliński (drums and percussion instruments), who then formed the core of the band Magda.

In March 2011 she performed in Oslo and Notodden, Norway, among others by Rita Engedalen. She represented Hohner at the Musikmesse in Frankfurt. The song I'd Rather Go Blind was released on two compilations in Singapore and Malaysia. Within a dozen or so months, the EQU Music release from Singapore has released 6 more songs with songs performed by the Polish vocalist: Darkness on the Delta, Temptation, Work Song and I Can Got The Beatles. British magazine Blues Matters published an interview with Piskorczyk conducted by musicians.

In autumn 2012 she gave a series of concerts in Taiwan, where she performed at the 9th Blues Bash Festival in Taipei, invited by the blues association. Portal  Polska ma sens  published a comprehensive text on Magda Piskorczyk, entitled: "A Polish lady who feels the blues" 

In 2011-2012 she also taught as a music teacher at the Magda Piskorczyk Masterclass at the Ochota Culture Center in Warsaw. The result is recorded in the studio OKO and released in 2012 "Magda Piskorczyk Masterclass". Magda was not only the originator of the whole course and concept of the disc, but also the producer of the music, the producer of the sound and the mix. The album presents 11 very stylistically selected works with the participants of the course. Since 2012 she teaches at her own class according to his own program  "the Blues on the Bobr" in Kliczków.

In December 2012, at the Autumn Festival with the Blues in Bialystok, she celebrated her 10th solo career.

Since 2014 she has been the Artistic Director of the Blues Workshop on Bobrow.

Team 
Magda Piskorczyk (vocals, arrangements, compositions, acoustic, electric and bass guitar and percussion instruments) occurs with the ensemble composed of:

 Aleksandra Siemieniuk - good, acoustic and electric guitar;
 Bartosz Kazek - drums;

Extended composition and special projects, e.g. gospel:

 Stanislaw Witta - piano, organ of Hammond;
 Jacek Cichocki - piano, organ of Hammond;
 Roman Ziobro - bass, bass guitar;
 Marcin Jahr - drums;
 Bogumił Romanowski - drums;

Previous team members:

 Adam Rozenman - percussion instruments;
 Grzegorz Zawiliński - percussion and percussion instruments;
 Arkadiusz Osenkowski - saxophone;
 Maksymilian Ziobro - drums

Discography 
 Magda Piskorczyk - Mahalia, Artgraff (2011)
 Magda Piskorczyk feat. Billy Gibson - Afro Groove, Artgraff (2011), BSMF Records Japan (2011)
 Magda Piskorczyk & Slidin 'Slim - Live at Satyrblues, Artgraff (2010)
 Magda Piskorczyk - Magda Live, Artgraff (2008)
 Magda Piskorczyk - Blues Traveling, MTJ (2005)
 Magda Piskorczyk - Make Your Spirit Fly, Demo (2002)

Guest vocalist and special projects 
 Blues Menu Not the Blues itself, (2013)
 Magda Piskorczyk Master Class, Ochota Culture Center (2012)
 Antoni Krupa - Amela. Blues with blown hair in the wind, Radio Kraków (2012)
 J.J.Band - Blues. J.Jandand friends play Tadeusz Nalepa (2010)
 Blues Flowers - Tasty !, Flower Records (2008)
 Blues Flowers - Bluesmen, Flower Records (2005)
 Patients on the blues sing songs by Sławom Wierzcholski, Omerta Art (2004)
 Blues Flowers - Silent Leader, Flower Records (2003)
 Blues Flowers - I will not be a good girl (single), Flower Records (2003)
 Blues Flowers - Let's be like kids (single), Flower Records (2003)
 The Jam Session Band One Night At Satyrblues Live, OKO (2003)

Compilations 
 Jazz Unlimited Vol.3, audiophile 2CD, track "Temptation", Singapore (2012)
 Great Songwriters' Songbook, CD, track "Temptation", Singapore (2012)
 Jazz Bar, Song "Work Song", Singapore (2012)
 Acoustic Edition II, audiophile CD, track "Darkness on the Delta", Singapore (2012)
 Jazz Unlimited, 2CD, track "I'd Rather go Blind", Singapore (2011)
 Jazz Addiction, audiophile CD, song "I'd Rather go Blind", Singapore (2011)
 Smooth jazz in Polish, 3CD, track I will not be a good girl, MTJ (2010)
 17 International Gastroblues Festival DVD, Hungary (2009)
 The Anthology of Polish Blues 2, songs: Never Make Your Move Too Soon and Blues Flowers: I will write you down in the diary, Polish Blues Association and 4evermusic (2009)
 Blues sur Seine Fete Ses 10 Ans, Walking Blues, ed. Blues sur Seine, France (2008)
 Anthology of Polish Blues, songs of: All of Me and Muddy Water Blues, Polish Blues Association and 4evermusic (2008)
 Blues sur Seine, 8eme edition, Help Me song, ed. Blues sur Seine, France (2006)

International festivals 
Magda Piskorczyk has been a guest at many international festivals, including:

 Blue Wave Festival, Rugen Island, Germany (2014) 
 Vienna Blues Spring Festival, Austria (2014) 
 Chemnitzer Stadtfest, Chemnitz, Germany (2013)
 Bluesovy Podzimek, Holešov, Czech Republic (2013)
 Prerov Jazz Festival, Prerov, Czech Republic (2009, 2013)
 Southern Rock and Blues Festival, Kolin, Czech Republic (2013)
 Old Jazz Meeting, Złota Tarka, Iława (2013)
 Głogów Jazz Meetings, Glogow (2013)
 Torun Blues Meeting, Torun (2013)
 Chemnitzer Blues Festival, Germany (2013)
 Blues Bash, Taipei, Taiwan (2012)
 Blues au chateau Festival, La Cheze, France (2012)
 Picnic Country, Dąbrowa Górnicza (2012)
 Bluesfest Eutin / Bluesbaltica Festival, Eutin, Germany (2011)
 Suwalki Blues Festival, Suwalki (2011)
 Plus Tennis Music Festival, Szczecin (2010)
 Dusty Road Blues Festival, Tidaholm, Sweden (2010)
 Bluescamp Festival, Fredrikstad, Norway (2010)
 Harmonica Bridge, Torun and Bydgoszcz (2010)
 Satyrblues, Tarnobrzeg (2003, 2009, 2010)
 Trossinger Blues Fabrik, Trossingen, Germany (2009)
 City Sings Gospel, Liverpool, UK (2008)
 Angels, Bieszczady (2008)
 Bluestures (Blues Top), Chorzów and Zakopane (2007)
 Blues Goes East, Karlsruhe, Germany (2007)
 Bluezzfest, Bulgaria (2006)
 Blues Sur Seine, France (2006)
 Jimiway Blues Festival, Ostrów Wielkopolski (2002, 2006)
 Resonator Festival, Sulingen, Germany (2005, 2006)
 Dobrofest, Trnava, Slovakia (2005)
 Potsdam Bluesfestival, Germany (2004)
 Berlin Bluesfestival, Germany (2004)
 Blues Alive, Šumperk, Czech Republic (2002)

References

External links 
 The official website of Magdy Piskorczyk
 Her interview with bluesonline.pl, December 2011 
 Interview with Polish Radio, June 2008
 Interview with the website Gery.pl, May 2008

21st-century Polish singers
Polish blues singers
Polish gospel singers
Polish singer-songwriters
Living people
Polish rock guitarists
Polish jazz guitarists
21st-century Polish women singers
Year of birth missing (living people)